The Cross Lake Islanders are a junior "B" ice hockey team based in Cross Lake, Manitoba. They are members of the Keystone Junior Hockey League (KJHL). The Islanders compete out of the Cross Lake Sports Arena, a 1,200-seat facility.

History 
Originally formed in 2006, the Islanders ceased operations after four seasons in the KJHL. The team struggled to be competitive in each of its first four seasons winning just 22 games.

After a five-year hiatus, the club returned to the league in 2015. Former Islanders player Harley Garrioch, who played college hockey at Neumann University in Philadelphia, returned home to lead the club.

Season-by-season
Note: GP = Games played, W = Wins, L = Losses, T = Ties, OTL = Overtime Losses, Pts = Points, GF = Goals for, GA = Goals against

Coaches
 Angus McDonald
 Nigel Sette
 Morgan Blacksmith
 Harley Garrioch
 Trent Spence
 Jeff Monias
 Dennis Trout

References

External links
KJHL.ca
@CLIslanders

Ice hockey teams in Manitoba
2006 establishments in Manitoba